Lucie Haršányová (born 27 August 1990) is a Slovak football defender who plays for German club MSV Duisburg. She previously represented the Swiss club FC Neunkirch as well as SV Neulengbach in the Austrian ÖFB-Frauenliga and UEFA Women's Champions League. In summer 2015 Haršányová transferred from Neulengbach to FC Neunkirch of the Swiss Nationalliga A.

She is a member of the Slovakia national team.

References

External links

 

1990 births
Living people
Women's association football defenders
Slovak women's footballers
Sportspeople from Trnava
Slovakia women's international footballers
ŠK Slovan Bratislava (women) players
SV Neulengbach (women) players
FC Neunkirch players
MSV Duisburg (women) players
Serie A (women's football) players
Hellas Verona Women players
Slovak expatriate footballers
Slovak expatriate sportspeople in Austria
Expatriate women's footballers in Austria
Slovak expatriate sportspeople in Switzerland
Expatriate women's footballers in Switzerland
Slovak expatriate sportspeople in Germany
Expatriate women's footballers in Germany
Slovak expatriate sportspeople in Italy
Expatriate women's footballers in Italy
ÖFB-Frauenliga players
Frauen-Bundesliga players
Swiss Women's Super League players